Donald or Don Jones may refer to:

Arts and entertainment
Donald Jones (actor) (1932–2004), Dutch actor and dancer
Don Jones (arts) (1923–2015),  American artist and art therapist
Don Jones, actor in Agent Cody Banks 2: Destination London

Politicians
Don Jones (Louisiana politician) (born 1949), American politician and businessman
Don Jones (Montana politician), in Montana House of Representatives

Sports
Donald Jones (linebacker) (born 1969), American football linebacker
Don Jones (safety) (born 1990), American football player
Donald Jones (wide receiver) (born 1987), American football wide receiver
Donnie Jones (basketball) (Donald Isaac Jones Sr., born 1966), American college basketball coach
Donnie Jones (Donald Scott Jones Jr., born 1980), American football punter
Don Jones (Canadian football), see Lionel Conacher Award

Others
Don A. Jones (1912–2000), American admiral and civil engineer, with the United States Coast and Geodetic Survey, and the Environmental Science Services Administration Corps
Don Jones (wireless health), American health care businessman
Donald F. Jones (1890–1963), American geneticist
Donald S. Jones (1928–2004), United States Navy admiral
Donald Spence Jones (1836–1917), Anglican dean and author